Lucius Roscius was one of four Roman envoys sent to Fidenae in 438 BC after it revolted against Roman rule and allied itself with the Etruscan city state of Veii. He, and the three other Roman emissaries, were murdered on the orders of the King of Veii, Lars Tolumnius. The four were honored with statues at the rostra.

References

5th-century BC Romans
Roscii
Year of birth unknown
430s BC deaths
Assassinated diplomats
5th-century BC diplomats